Bévéziers (Q179) was a Redoutable-class submarine of the French Navy. The class is also known as the "1500-ton class" and were termed in French . She was named after the 1690 Battle of Beachy Head, known in France as the Bataille de Bévéziers.

History

Development
Bévéziers was one of 31 Redoutable-class submarines, also designated as the 1500 ton boats because of their displacement. The class entered service between 1931 and 1939.

The submarines' electrical propulsion allowed them to attain speeds of  while submerged.

Laid down on 4 April 1932, Bévéziers was launched on 14 October 1935 and commissioned on 4 June 1937.

Second World War 

On the declaration of war on 3 September 1939, Bévéziers was sent to patrol the ports on the northern Spanish coastline, where part of the German commercial fleet had taken refuge, and were suspected of supplying German U-boats. At the beginning of October, the boat was sent with the 8th Division to the Antilles. Following some repairs and refitting, the Bévéziers was sent to Casablanca, and was there when the armistice between France and Germany was concluded on 20 June 1940. The submarine then patrolled the Gulf of Guinea and returned to Dakar on 21 August 1940.

Under the command of Capitaine de corvette Lancelot, Bévéziers was in dock at Dakar when, on 23 September, Free French and British forces attacked the city. The repair was quickly abandoned and the submarine was hastily refloated. Bévéziers went on to torpedo the British battleship  on 25 September, damaging her and putting her out of action for nearly nine months.

On 28 October Bévéziers joined Casabianca, Sfax and Sidi-Ferruch to form the 2nd Submarine Division, based in Casablanca. She then sailed to Toulon on 3 January 1941, where she was placed under guard before undergoing a refit. On 12 November the boat was rearmed and sent to Madagascar, where she arrived on 19 February 1942.

On 5 May 1942, the submarine was taken by surprise during the preliminary bombardments which began the Battle of Madagascar. She quickly put to sea with two thirds of her crew at 0600. Three Fairey Swordfish fired on the boat, which changed course to evade attack. She came under continued attack, which damaged the boat's hull. One of the three Swordfish managed to dismount Bévézierss machine gun, causing the disappearance of two of the crew and the wounding of four more. The submarine then sank.

Recovered and refitted by the Allies the following year and placed in reserve, the submarine was scrapped in 1946. A large part of the boat's hull was nevertheless still visible in 2004 in the Port de la Nièvre at Antsiranana.

Notes

References

Further reading
Rohwer, Jürgen and Gerhard Hümmelchen. Chronology of the War at Sea 1939–1945. London: Greenhill Books, 1992. .

Redoutable-class submarines (1928)
Ships built in France
1935 ships
World War II submarines of France
Submarines sunk by aircraft
Maritime incidents in May 1942
Ships sunk by British aircraft